Gekko trinotaterra is a species of gecko. It is found in Southeast Asia.

References 

Gekko
Reptiles described in 1999